Warm Springs is a city in Meriwether County, Georgia, United States. The population was 465 at the 2020 census.

History
Residents of Georgia, particularly Savannah, began spending vacations at Bullochville in the late 18th century as a way to escape yellow fever, finding the number of warm springs in the vicinity of Bullochville very attractive. In the late 19th century traveling to the warm springs was a way to escape the city (in this case Atlanta) for a short while. One of the places benefiting from this was the Meriwether Inn. Once the automobile became popular in the early 20th century, tourists began going elsewhere, starting the decline of the inn.

In 1921, Franklin Roosevelt contracted a paralytic illness, diagnosed at the time as poliomyelitis (later thought in a 2003 peer-reviewed retrospective study to be Guillain–Barré syndrome). He tried to regain strength in his legs by bathing and exercising in the warm water. His first time in Warm Springs was October 1924. He went to a resort in the town whose attraction was a permanent  natural spring. He was a constant visitor for two decades, and renamed the town from Bullochville to Warm Springs.

Roosevelt had a cottage built in 1932 that became famous as the Little White House, where he vacationed while president, because of his illness. He died there in 1945, and the home is now a public museum. 

The town is still home to the Roosevelt Warm Springs Institute for Rehabilitation (Roosevelt's former polio hospital), which remains a world-renowned comprehensive rehabilitation center including a physical rehabilitation hospital and vocational rehabilitation unit. Economist Thomas M. Humphrey was one of the children treated for polio at the institute during the 1940s. The springs are not available for public use as a bath/spa resort, but they are used by the Roosevelt Institute for therapeutic purposes.

Geography
Warm Springs is located in southern Meriwether County at  (32.888689, −84.680089). It is bordered to the south by Talbot County and to the west by F. D. Roosevelt State Park, including the Little White House.

U.S. Route 27 Alternate passes through the center of Warm Springs, leading north  to Greenville, the Meriwether county seat, and southwest  to Columbus. Georgia State Route 41 leads southeast  to Manchester, the largest city in Meriwether County, while State Route 85 leads northeast  to Woodbury.

Warm Springs Branch and Cold Branch drain the area around the city center, both flowing north to Cane Creek, an east-flowing tributary of the Flint River. The southern, rural part of the city on Pine Mountain drains east to Pigeon Creek, another tributary of the Flint.

Demographics

As of the census of 2010, there were 485 people, 172 households, and 107 families residing in the city. The racial makeup of the city was 67.22% White, 31.75% African American, and 1.03% from two or more races.

There were 172 households, out of which 26.9% had children under the age of 18 living with them, 34.3% were married couples living together, 25.1% had a female householder with no husband present, and 36.6% were non-families. 34.3% of all households were made up of individuals, and 16.0% had someone living alone who was 65 years of age or older. The average household size was 2.33 and the average family size was 2.99.

In the city, the population was spread out, with 21.2% under the age of 18, 7.4% from 18 to 24, 22.1% from 25 to 44, 20.6% from 45 to 64, and 28.7% who were 65 years of age or older. The median age was 45 years. For every 100 females, there were 62.8 males. For every 100 females age 18 and over, there were 57.2 males.

The median income for a household in the city was $21,547, and the median income for a family was $29,950. Males had a median income of $24,422 versus $13,110 for females. The per capita income for the city was $14,872. About 14.7% of families and 16.4% of the population were below the poverty line, including 21.7% of those under age 18 and 9.3% of those age 65 or over.

Notable people
After graduating from John H. Francis Polytechnic High School, Cosmopolitan editor Helen Gurley Brown and her family moved to Warm Springs.
George W. Jenkins, founder of Publix, was born in Warm Springs.
Philanthropist George Foster Peabody retired in Warm Springs.
Cpl. Maoma L. Ridings was from Warm Springs. She was a WAC stationed at Camp Atterbury, and was murdered August 28, 1943, in Room 729 of the Claypool Hotel in Downtown Indianapolis. Her murder was never solved, and made national news because she had once been a nurse to President Roosevelt on his visits to Warm Springs.
US President Franklin Delano Roosevelt lived in the Little White House in Warm Springs while he was not in Washington or at his residence in Hyde Park, New York. He also died there.

Gallery

References

Relevant literature
 Harmon, Martin. 2014 The Warm Springs Story: Legacy and Legend. Macon, GA: Mercer University Press.

External links

Roosevelt Memorial Airport

Cities in Georgia (U.S. state)
Cities in Meriwether County, Georgia
Spa towns in the United States
Hot springs of Georgia (U.S. state)
Franklin D. Roosevelt
Bodies of water of Meriwether County, Georgia